In astrophysics, the virial mass is the mass of a gravitationally bound astrophysical system, assuming the virial theorem applies. In the context of galaxy formation and dark matter halos, the virial mass is defined as the mass enclosed within the virial radius  of a gravitationally bound system, a radius within which the system obeys the virial theorem. The virial radius is determined using a "top-hat" model. A spherical "top hat" density perturbation destined to become a galaxy begins to expand, but the expansion is halted and reversed due to the mass collapsing under gravity until the sphere reaches equilibrium – it is said to be virialized. Within this radius, the sphere obeys the virial theorem which says that the average kinetic energy is equal to minus one half times the average potential energy, and this radius defines the virial radius.

Virial radius 

The virial radius of a gravitationally bound astrophysical system is the radius within which the virial theorem applies. It is defined as the radius at which the density is equal to the critical density  of the universe at the redshift of the system, multiplied by an overdensity constant :

The time dependence of the Hubble parameter indicates that the redshift of the system is important, as the Hubble parameter changes with time: today's Hubble parameter, referred to as the Hubble constant , is not the same as the Hubble parameter at an earlier time in the Universe's history, or in other words, at a different redshift. The overdensity  is given by

Since it depends on the density parameter , its value depends on the cosmological model used. In an Einstein–de Sitter model it equals . This definition is not universal, however, as the exact value of  depends on the cosmology. In an Einstein–de Sitter model, it is assumed that the density parameter is due to matter only, where . Using this convention, the mean density is given by

Defining the virial mass 

Given the virial radius and the overdensity convention, the virial mass  can be found through the relation

If the convention that  is used, then this becomeswhere  is the Hubble parameter as described above, and G is the gravitational constant. This defines the virial mass of an astrophysical system.

Applications to dark matter halos 
The total mass of the dark matter halo can then be computed by integrating over the volume of the density out to the virial radius :

From the definition of the circular velocity,  we can find the circular velocity at the virial radius :Then the circular velocity for the dark matter halo is given bywhere .

Although the NFW profile is commonly used, other profiles like the Einasto profile and profiles that take into account the adiabatic contraction of the dark matter due to the baryonic content are also used to characterize dark matter halos.

To compute the total mass of the system, including stars, gas, and dark matter, the Jeans equations need to be used with density profiles for each component.

See also 

 Dark matter halo
 Jeans equations
 Navarro–Frenk–White profile
 Virial theorem

References

Stellar astronomy
Galactic astronomy
Extragalactic astronomy